Infinity, Inc. is a team of superheroes that appear in comic books published by DC Comics.

The team has existed in three distinct iterations. These roster lists are of the members during each of those incarnations.

The codenames listed under "Character" are those used during the time frame of the particular iteration. Characters with more than one codename for that period have them listed chronologically and separated by a slash (/). Bolded names in the most recent iteration published are the current team members.

"First appearance" is the place where the character first appeared as a member of a particular iteration. It is not necessarily the first appearance of the character in print, nor the story depicting how the character joined the team.

All information is listed in publication order first, then alphabetical.

Original roster
This roster covers the iteration of the team that appeared during the 1980s created by Roy Thomas and Dann Thomas.

Second roster
This roster covers the iteration of the team that appears during the series 52.

Third roster
This roster was featured in Infinity Inc. Vol. 2.

References

Infinity Inc. members